The Spy is a 1931 American pre-Code drama film directed by Berthold Viertel and written by Ernest Pascal. The film stars Kay Johnson, Neil Hamilton, John Halliday, Milton Holmes, Freddie Burke Frederick and Austen Jewell. The film was released on April 26, 1931, by Fox Film Corporation.

Cast    
Kay Johnson as Anna Turin
Neil Hamilton as Ivan Turin
John Halliday as Sergei Krasnoff
Milton Holmes as Yashka
Freddie Burke Frederick as Kalya
Austen Jewell as Petya
Henry Kolker as Tchijinski
Douglas Haig as Seryoska
David Durand as Vanya
Mischa Auer as Man in Cafe

References

External links
 

1931 films
American drama films
1931 drama films
Fox Film films
Films directed by Berthold Viertel
American black-and-white films
1930s English-language films
1930s American films